Kyaing is a village in Tilin Township, Gangaw District, in the north-western part of the Magway Region in Myanmar.  Kyaing lies on the right (western) bank of the Ywa Chaung tributary of the Maw River.

Notes

External links
 "Kyaing Map — Satellite Images of Kyaing" Maplandia

Populated places in Magway Region